Events from the year 1960 in the United States.

Incumbents

Federal Government 
 President: Dwight D. Eisenhower (R-Kansas/Pennsylvania)
 Vice President: Richard Nixon (R-California)
 Chief Justice: Earl Warren (California)
 Speaker of the House of Representatives: Sam Rayburn (D-Texas)
 Senate Majority Leader: Lyndon B. Johnson (D-Texas)
 Congress: 86th

Events

January
 January 2 – U.S. Senator John F. Kennedy (D-MA) announces his candidacy for the Democratic presidential nomination.
 January 19 – The Treaty of Mutual Cooperation and Security between the United States and Japan is signed in Washington, D.C.
 January 23 – Jacques Piccard and Don Walsh descend into the Mariana Trench in the bathyscaphe Trieste, reaching the depth of 10,916 meters.
 January 25 – In Washington, D.C., the National Association of Broadcasters reacts to the payola scandal by threatening fines for any disc jockeys accepting money for playing particular records.

 January 28 – The National Football League announces expansion teams for Dallas to start in the 1960 NFL season, and Minneapolis–St. Paul for the 1961 NFL season.

February
 February 1 – Greensboro sit-ins: In Greensboro, North Carolina, four black students from North Carolina Agricultural and Technical State University begin a sit-in at a segregated Woolworth's lunch counter. Although they are refused service, they are allowed to stay at the counter. The event triggers many similar nonviolent protests throughout the Southern United States, and six months later, the original four protesters are served lunch at the same counter.
 February 9
 Adolph Coors III, the chairman of the board of the Coors Brewing Company, is kidnapped in the United States, and his captors demand a ransom of $500,000. Coors is later found murdered, and Joseph Corbett Jr. is indicted for the crime.
 Joanne Woodward receives the first star on the Hollywood Walk of Fame.
 February 11 – The airship ZPG-3W is destroyed in a storm in Massachusetts.
 February 13 – Nashville sit-ins begin.
 February 18 – The 1960 Winter Olympics open in Squaw Valley, Placer County, California.
 February 29 – The first Playboy Club opens in Chicago.

March
 March 3 – Elvis Presley returns home from Germany to the United States, after being away on military duty for 2 years.
 March 5 – Elvis Presley receives his honorable discharge from the U.S. Army.
 March 6 – Vietnam War: The United States announces that 3,500 American soldiers will be sent to Vietnam.
 March 17 – Northwest Airlines Flight 710 crashes near Tell City, Indiana, killing all 61 on board.
 March 22 – Arthur Leonard Schawlow and Charles Hard Townes receive the first patent for a laser.
 March 28 – Director Stanley Kramer receives the first star on the Hollywood Walk of Fame.

April
 April 4 
 The 32nd Academy Awards ceremony, hosted by Bob Hope, is held at RKO Pantages Theatre in Hollywood. William Wyler's Ben-Hur wins eleven awards (breaking the record set by Gigi the previous year), including Best Motion Picture and Wyler's third Best Director win (his first since 1946). The film also receives the most nominations with 12.
 Elvis Presley's song "Are You Lonesome Tonight?" is recorded for the first time.
 April 13 – The United States launches navigation satellite Transit I-b.
 April 17 – Russwood Park, a baseball stadium in Memphis, Tennessee, burns to the ground shortly after a Chicago White Sox versus Cleveland Indians game.

May
 May 1 – A Soviet missile shoots down an American Lockheed U-2 spy plane; the pilot Gary Powers is captured.
 May 3 – The Fantasticks, the world's longest-running musical, opens at New York City's Sullivan Street Playhouse, where it will play for 42 years.
 May 4 – A. J. Liebling promulgates Liebling's Law in The New Yorker Magazine: "Freedom of the press is guaranteed only to those who own one."
 May 6 – President Dwight Eisenhower signs the Civil Rights Act of 1960 into law.
 May 9 – The U.S. Food and Drug Administration announces that it will approve birth control as an additional indication for Searle's Enovid, making it the world's first approved oral contraceptive pill.
 May 10 – The nuclear submarine USS Triton, under the command of Captain Edward L. Beach Jr., completes the first underwater circumnavigation of the Earth.
 May 16
Theodore Maiman operates the first laser.
Nikita Khrushchev demands an apology from U.S. President Dwight D. Eisenhower for U-2 spy plane flights over the Soviet Union, thus ending the 1960 Paris summit.
 May 20 – In Japan, police carry away Socialist members of the Diet who are protesting the Treaty of Mutual Cooperation and Security between the United States and Japan; the Japanese House of Representatives then approves the treaty.
 May 25 – Brooklyn–Battery Tunnel opens between Manhattan and Brooklyn.

June
 June 7 – U.S. Senator John F. Kennedy wins the California Democratic primary.
 June 16 – Psychological horror film Psycho is released, directed by Alfred Hitchcock.
 June 22 – The United States Naval Research Laboratory SOLRAD 1 Galactic Radiation and Background program satellite is successfully launched by a Thor-Ablestar rocket (along with navigation satellite Transit 2A), serving as the first successful U.S. reconnaissance satellite over the Soviet Union and returning the first real-time X-ray and ultraviolet observations of the Sun.
 June 23 – Little Missouri National Grassland is established.
 June 29 – Bhumibol Adulyadej becomes the first Thai monarch to address the United States Congress.

July

 July 1 – A Soviet MiG fighter north of Murmansk in the Barents Sea shoots down a 6-man RB-47. Two United States Air Force officers survive and are imprisoned in Moscow's dreaded Lubyanka prison.
 July 4 – Following the admission of Hawaii as the 50th U.S. state the previous year, the 50-star flag of the United States debuts in Philadelphia, Pennsylvania.
 July 11 – Harper Lee releases her critically acclaimed novel To Kill a Mockingbird.
 July 13 – U.S. Senator John F. Kennedy is nominated for president at the Democratic National Convention in Los Angeles, California.
 July 21 – Francis Chichester, English navigator and yachtsman, arrives in New York aboard Gypsy Moth II, having made a record solo Atlantic crossing in 40 days.
 July 25 – The Woolworth's counter in Greensboro, North Carolina, the subject of a sit-in which sparked sit-ins and pickets across the southern United States in February 1960, serves its first black customer.
 July 25–28 – In Chicago, the Republican National Convention nominates U.S. Vice President Richard M. Nixon for president and Henry Cabot Lodge Jr. for vice president.

August
 August 6 – Cuban Revolution: In response to a United States embargo against Cuba, Fidel Castro nationalizes American and foreign-owned property in the nation.
He sets world records for: high-altitude jump; free-fall by falling  before opening his parachute; and fastest speed by a human without motorized assistance, 982 km/h (614 mi/h). These records would stand unbeaten for over 60 years.
 August 17 – The trial of U-2 pilot Francis Gary Powers begins in Moscow.
 August 18 – United States president Dwight Eisenhower is briefed on the Congo crisis at a meeting with the U.S. National Security Council, and asks whether the U.S. "can't get rid of this guy" (Patrice Lumumba).
 August 19 – Cold War: In Moscow, downed American U-2 pilot Francis Gary Powers is sentenced to 10 years imprisonment by the Soviet Union for espionage.
 August 25 – The USS Seadragon surfaces at the North Pole, where the crew plays softball.
 August 29 – Hurricane Donna kills 50 in Florida and New England.

September

 September 1 – Disgruntled railroad workers effectively halt operations of the Pennsylvania Railroad, marking the first shutdown in the company's history (the event lasts two days).
 September 5 – 1960 Summer Olympics: Cassius Clay wins the gold medal in boxing.
 September 8 – In Huntsville, Alabama, U.S. President Dwight D. Eisenhower formally dedicates the Marshall Space Flight Center (activated by NASA on July 1).
 September 26 – The two leading U.S. presidential candidates, Richard Nixon and John F. Kennedy, participate in the first televised presidential election debate.
 September 30 – Animated sitcom The Flintstones airs its first episode on the ABC network in the United States, becoming Hanna-Barbera’s first television series episode lasting half and hour.

October
 October 7 – Frank McGee hosts the second presidential debate.
 October 12 – John F. Kennedy speaks before the Ministerial Association of Houston, Texas, saying, in part, "I believe in an America where the separation of church and state is absolute; where no Catholic prelate would tell the American President, should he be Catholic, how to act; and where no Protestant minister would tell his parishioners for whom to vote."
 October 13 
 The third John F. Kennedy – Richard M. Nixon Presidential Debate takes place.
 The Pittsburgh Pirates defeat the New York Yankees in the seventh game of the World Series on Bill Mazeroski's walk-off home run.
 October 14 – U.S. presidential candidate John F. Kennedy first suggests the idea for the Peace Corps.
 October 21 – Quincy Howe hosts the final debate of the 1960 election.
 October 26 – Robert F. Kennedy calls Coretta Scott King, wife of Martin Luther King Jr., and secures his release from jail on a traffic violation in Atlanta, Georgia.
 October 29 – In Louisville, Kentucky, Cassius Clay (later Muhammad Ali) wins his first professional fight.

November

 November 8 – 1960 United States presidential election: In a close race, Democratic U. S. Senator John F. Kennedy is elected over Republican U.S. Vice President Richard M. Nixon, becoming (at 43) the youngest man elected president.
 November 13 – Sammy Davis Jr. marries Swedish actress May Britt.
 November 14 – New Orleans school desegregation crisis: Ruby Bridges and the McDonogh Three become the first black children to attend an all-white elementary school in Louisiana.
 November 15 – The Polaris missile is test-launched.
 November 24 – Basketball player Wilt Chamberlain grabs 55 rebounds in a single game, the all-time record in the NBA.

December

 December 2 – U.S. President Dwight D. Eisenhower authorizes the use of $1 million for the relief and resettlement of Cuban refugees, who have been arriving in Florida at the rate of 1,000 a week.
 December 5 – Boynton v. Virginia: The U.S. Supreme Court declares segregation in public transit to be illegal.
 December 9 – The first Domino's Pizza location opens in Ypsilanti, Michigan.
 December 11 – MGM's The Wizard of Oz is rerun on CBS only a year after its previous telecast, thus beginning the tradition of annual telecasts of the film in the United States.
 December 12 – The U.S. Supreme Court upholds a Federal Court ruling that Louisiana's segregation laws are unconstitutional.
 December 16 
U.S. Secretary of State Christian Herter announces that the United States will commit five atomic submarines and eighty Polaris missiles to NATO by the end of 1963.
1960 New York air disaster: United Airlines DC-8 collides with a TWA Lockheed Constellation over Staten Island, New York City. All 128 passengers and crew on both planes are killed, as are 6 persons on the ground.
 December 19 – Fire sweeps through the USS Constellation, the largest U.S. aircraft carrier, while it is under construction at a Brooklyn Navy Yard pier, killing 50 and injuring 150.
 December 20 – Discoverer 19 is launched into polar orbit from Vandenberg Air Force Base, to measure radiation.

Ongoing
 Cold War (1947–1991)
 Space Race (1957–1975)

Births
 January 1 – Michael Seibert, ice dancer and choreographer
 January 4 
 Art Paul Schlosser, singer-songwriter
 Michael Stipe, rock singer (R.E.M.)
 January 6 – Howie Long, American football player
 April Winchell, writer and voice actress
 January 12 – Dominique Wilkins, French-born basketball player
 January 19 
 Scott Thunes, bass player
 Will Wright, video game designer, co-founded Maxis
 January 21 – Toxey Haas, businessman, founder of Haas Outdoors, Inc.
 January 28 – Robert von Dassanowsky, cultural historian, writer and producer
 January 29
 Gia Carangi, model (d. 1986)
 Greg Louganis, diver
 Steve Sax, baseball player and sportscaster 
 February 3
 Tim Chandler, bass player (d. 2018)
 Marty Jannetty, wrestler and trainer
 Kerry Von Erich, wrestler (d. 1993)
 February 7
 Robert Smigel, actor, comedian and puppeteer
 James Spader, actor and producer
 February 13 – Gary Patterson, American football coach 
 February 14 – Jim Kelly, American football player
 February 18 – Tony Anselmo, animator and voice actor
 February 19 – John Paul Jr., racing driver (d. 2020)
 February 20 – Wendee Lee, voice actress
 February 21 – Henry G. Brinton, writer and minister
 February 22 – Charles Cullen, serial killer
 February 27 – Kara Kennedy, television producer, daughter of Ted Kennedy (d. 2011)
 February 29 – Tony Robbins, motivational speaker and author
 March 2 – Debra McMichael, wrestling valet
 March 7 – Joe Carter, baseball player
 March 8 
 Finn Carter, actress
 Jeffrey Eugenides, author
 March 9 – Finn Carter, actress and photographer
 March 13 – Joe Ranft, screenwriter, animator, storyboard artist and voice actor (d. 2005)
 March 14 – Kirby Puckett, baseball player (d. 2006)
 March 20 – Norm Magnusson, artist
 March 21 – Robert Sweet, rock drummer (Stryper)
 March 26
 Marcus Allen, American football player
 Jennifer Grey, actress
 Jon Huntsman Jr., businessman, diplomat, and politician
 April 8 – John Schneider, actor (The Dukes of Hazzard)
 April 12 – David Thirdkill, basketball player
 April 13 – Bob Casey Jr., U.S. Senator from Pennsylvania since 2007
 April 18 
 Jim Margraff, American football coach (d. 2019)
 J. Christopher Stevens, diplomat, U.S. Ambassador to Libya (d. 2012 in Libya)
 April 19 – Frank Viola, baseball player
 April 20 
 John Altenburgh, blues and jazz musician
 Rodney Holman, American football player and coach
 April 21 – Nate Thayer, journalist (d. 2023)
 April 23 – Valerie Bertinelli, actress and TV presenter (born April 23, 1960)
 April 28
 John Cerutti, baseball player (d. 2004)
 Elena Kagan, Associate Justice of the Supreme Court of the U.S. from 2010
 May 3 – Jaron Lanier, computer scientist
 May 6 – John Flansburgh, rock musician (They Might Be Giants)
 May 7 – Adam Bernstein, music video/television director
 May 8 – Eric Brittingham, rock bassist
 May 9 – Tony Gwynn, baseball player (d. 2014)
 May 10 – Dean Heller, U.S. Senator from Nevada since 2011 to 2019
 May 14 – Steve Williams, professional wrestler (d. 2009)
 May 20
 John Billingsley, actor
 Tony Goldwyn, actor, voice actor, and film director
 May 21
 Jeffrey Dahmer, serial killer (d. 1994)
 Kent Hrbek, baseball player
John O'Brien, novelist (d. 1994)
Jeffrey Toobin, lawyer and essayist
 May 25 – Amy Klobuchar, U.S. Senator from Minnesota since 2007
 June 1 – Lucy McBath, politician
 June 3 – Don Brown, novelist, author and attorney
 June 4 – Paul Taylor, musician (Winger)
 June 5 – Paul Montgomery, entrepreneur and inventor (d. 1999)
 June 6 
 Ervin A. Gonzalez, attorney (d. 2017) 
 Steve Vai, guitarist
 June 8
 Gary Trousdale, animator and film director
 Diane Meredith Belcher, concert organist, teacher, and church musician
 Garth Smith, pianist
 June 12
 Meredith Brooks, singer
 Joe Kopicki, basketball player
 June 14 – Mike Laga, baseball player 
 June 17 – Thomas Haden Church, film actor
 June 21 – Kevin Harlan, sports announcer
 June 22 – Erin Brockovich, environmental activist
 June 24 
 Siedah Garrett, singer-songwriter and pianist (Brand New Heavies)
 Chris Knight, singer-songwriter
 June 26 – Zachary Breaux, jazz guitarist (d. 1997)
 June 28 – John Elway, football player
 June 30 – David Headley, terrorist
 July 1 – Guy Williams, basketball player
 July 4
 Sid Eudy, professional wrestler
 Barry Windham, professional wrestler
 July 5 
 Bruce Lanoil, actor and voice actor
 Jack Radcliffe, pornographic film actor
 Pruitt Taylor Vince, actor
 July 9 – Marc Mero, amateur boxer and professional wrestler
 July 10 – Ariel Castro, criminal (d. 2013)
 July 11 – David Baerwald singer-songwriter (David & David)
 July 14 
 Kyle Gass, singer-songwriter and guitarist and actor
 Jane Lynch, actress, comedian and author
 July 15 – Kim Alexis, model and actress
 July 16
 Leila Kenzle, actress
 Todd Brown, American football player
 July 18 – Anne-Marie Johnson, actress
 July 22 – Jon Oliva, vocalist and pianist (Savatage)
 August 7 –  David Duchovny, actor
 August 13 – Lorna Simpson, African-American photographic and video artist
 August 17 – Sean Penn, film actor
 August 19 – Ron Darling, baseball player and sportscaster
 August 26 – Branford Marsalis, African-American jazz musician
 September 1 – Joseph Williams, singer and film score composer
 September 14 – Melissa Leo, film actress
 September 17 – Alan Krueger, economist and advisor to U.S. President Barack Obama (d. 2019)
 September 19 – Yolanda Saldívar, murderer of Selena Quintanilla
 September 21 – Mary Mara, actress (d. 2022)
 September 30 – Blanche Lincoln, U.S. Senator from Arkansas from 1999 to 2011
 October 4
 Billy Hatcher, baseball player
 Blake Nordstrom, businessman (d. 2019)
 October 5 – Daniel Baldwin, actor
 October 13 
 Joey Belladonna, born Joseph Bellardini, thrash metal vocalist (Anthrax)
 Tim Brewster, American football player and coach
 Ari Fleischer, journalist and politician, 24th White House Press Secretary
 Peter Keisler, lawyer and politician, United States Attorney General
 October 18 – Craig Mello, biologist
 October 19 – Kerry Sanders, news correspondent
 October 20 – Peter Fitzgerald, U.S. Senator from Illinois from 1999 to 2011
 October 21 – Paul Rugg, voice actor and producer
 October 24 
 Dennis Anderson, monster truck driver
 BD Wong, actor
 October 28
 Landon Curt Noll, American astronomer, cryptographer and mathematician
 David Cote, leader of the Democrats in the New Hampshire House of Representatives
 November 3
 Francis J. Beckwith, philosopher
 Karch Kiraly, volleyball player
 November 6 – Lance Kerwin, actor (d. 2023)
 November 11 
 Billy James, musician, music producer, writer
 Stanley Tucci, actor and film director
 November 13 – Neil Flynn, actor 
 November 14 – Tom Judson, musical theatre actor
 November 15 – Keith Washington, singer
 November 19 – Matt Sorum, hard rock drummer of Guns N' Roses, Velvet Revolver and The Cult
 November 25 
Amy Grant, Christian singer-songwriter and actress
John F. Kennedy Jr., lawyer and journalist, son of President John F. Kennedy (d. 1999)
 December 1 – Carol Alt, model and actress
 December 2 
 Deb Haaland, politician
 Sydney Youngblood, singer
 December 3
 Daryl Hannah, actress
 Julianne Moore, actress
 December 5 – Brian Bromberg, jazz bassist and composer
 December 9 – Jeff "Swampy" Marsh, television director, writer, producer, storyboard artist and actor
 December 10 – Michael Schoeffling, actor and model
 December 16 – Sid Eudy, pro wrestler
 December 21
Roger McDowell, baseball player and coach
Tim Rucks, American football player and coach (d. 2015)
Andy Van Slyke, baseball player and coach
 December 22 – Jean-Michel Basquiat, artist (d. 1988)
 December 27 – Fred Hammond, African American gospel musician
 December 30 – Heather Wilson, soldier and politician; Secretary of the Air Force
 December 31 – John Allen Muhammad, African-American spree killer (d. 2009)

Deaths

January–June
 January 1 – Margaret Sullavan, film actress (b. 1909)
 January 4 – Dudley Nichols, screenwriter (b. 1895)
 January 10 – Arthur S. Carpender, admiral (b. 1884)
 January 12 – William Adams Delano, architect (b. 1874)
 January 16 – Rudulph Evans, sculptor (b. 1878)
 January 24
 John Miljan, film actor (b. 1892)
 Matt Moore, Irish-American film actor (b. 1888)
 January 25 – Diana Barrymore, stage & film actress (b. 1921)
 January 28 – Zora Neale Hurston, African-American folklorist and author (b. 1891)
 February 6 – Jesse Belvin, R&B singer (b. 1932)
 February 12 – Bobby Clark, comedian and singer (b. 1888)
 February 29
 Melvin Purvis, law officer (b. 1903)
 Walter Yust, encyclopedia editor (b. 1894)
 March 4 – Leonard Warren, operatic baritone (b. 1911)
 March 11
 Roy Chapman Andrews, explorer, adventurer and naturalist (b. 1884)
 Takuma Kajiwara, Japanese-born photographer (b. 1876)
 March 26 – Ian Keith, actor (b. 1899)
 April 5 – Alma Kruger, actress (b. 1868)
 April 17 – Eddie Cochran, rock singer (b. 1938)
 April 19 – Beardsley Ruml, economist (b. 1894)
 April 25 – Hope Emerson, actress (b. 1897)
 May 2 – Caryl Chessman, criminal (b. 1921)
 May 11 –  John D. Rockefeller Jr., financier and philanthropist, son of John D. Rockefeller (b. 1874)
 May 22 – Claire Phillips, spy (b. 1907)
 May 27
 Edward Brophy, actor (b. 1895)
 James Montgomery Flagg, artist and illustrator (b. 1877)
 June 4 – Lucien Littlefield, actor (b. 1895)
 June 6 – Ernest L. Blumenschein, painter, member of Taos art colony (b. 1874)
 June 20 – John B. Kelly Sr., Olympic rower (father of Grace Kelly) (b. 1889)
 June 25 – Tommy Corcoran, baseball player (b. 1869)

July–December
 July 12 – Buddy Adler, film producer (b. 1906)
 July 15 – Lawrence Tibbett, operatic baritone (b. 1896)
 July 16 – John P. Marquand, novelist (b. 1893)
 July 26 – Cedric Gibbons, Irish-American art director (b. 1893)
 August 10 – Frank Lloyd, film director (b. 1886)
 August 14 – Fred Clarke, baseball player (Pittsburgh Pirates), member of MLB Hall of Fame (b. 1872)
 August 23 – Oscar Hammerstein II, librettist (b. 1895)
 August 27 – Stanley Clifford Weyman, impostor (b. 1890)
 September 1 – Aunt Molly Jackson, folk singer and union activist (b. 1880)
 September 8 – Oscar Pettiford, African-American jazz bassist and composer (b. 1922)
 September 11 – Edwin Justus Mayer, screenwriter (b. 1896)
 September 20 – David Park, painter (b. 1911)
 September 23 – Kathlyn Williams, actress (b. 1879)
 October 11 – Richard Cromwell, actor (b. 1910)
 October 15 – Clara Kimball Young, actress (b. 1890)
 October 22 – Morgan Dennis, painter and illustrator (b. 1892)
 October 31 – H. L. Davis, author (b. 1894)
 November 3
 Bobby Wallace, baseball player (St. Louis Browns), member of MLB Hall of Fame (b. 1873)
 Paul Willis, silent film actor (b. 1901)
 November 5
 Ward Bond, film actor (b. 1903)
 Johnny Horton, country singer (b. 1925)
 November 7 – A. P. Carter, singer and songwriter (b. 1891)
 November 12 – Lord Buckley, monologist (b. 1906)
 November 14 – Walter Catlett, actor (b. 1889)
 November 16 – Clark Gable, film actor (b. 1901)
 November 17 – Gene Ahern, comic-strip artist (b. 1895)
 November 19 – Phyllis Haver, film actress (b. 1899)
 November 28
James Bert Garner, chemical engineer and inventor (b. 1870) 
 Richard Wright, African-American novelist (b. 1908)
 November 5 – Johnny Horton, country singer, in automobile accident (b. 1925)
 December 8 – Ross T. McIntire, naval surgeon (b. 1889)
 December 13 – John Charles Thomas, operatic baritone (b. 1891)
 December 26 – Giuseppe Bellanca, Italian-American aircraft designer and company founder (b. 1886)

See also
 List of American films of 1960
 Timeline of United States history (1950–1969)

References

External links
 

 
1960s in the United States
United States
United States
Years of the 20th century in the United States